David Lindsay, 1st Earl of Crawford (c. 13601407) was a Scottish peer who was created Earl of Crawford in 1398.

Life
Crawford was the son of Sir Alexander Lindsay of Glenesk and Katherine Stirling. Succeeding his father in 1381, he was known until his elevation to the peerage as Sir David Lindsay of Glenesk. He was also the 10th baron of Crawford, Lanarkshire. In 1398, his father-in-law Robert II gave him the title of earl, along with Crawford Castle.

Many historians believe that Lindsay was also the organiser for the Battle of the Clans at Perth in 1396.  Additionally, Lindsay was a noted jousting champion who fought the English champion Lord Welles in a remarkable duel on St. George's Day 1390.  In the duel, Lindsay unhorsed Welles so easily that the crowd began yelling that he had nailed himself to his saddle. To prove he had not, Lindsay jumped off his horse and then back on, while still wearing his full suit of armour. After he realized Welles was wounded he rushed to his aid and helped him to a nearby hospital. He visited Welles every day while he was recovering and they became good friends.

Lord Crawford died at Finavon Castle in 1407 and was buried at the church of the Greyfriars at Dundee.

Marriage and issue

He married Elizabeth Stewart, daughter of King Robert II and Euphemia de Ross. They had four children:

Alexander Lindsay, 2nd Earl of Crawford (c. 1387–1438)
Gerard Lindsay (died 1421)
David Lindsay, Lord of Newdosk (born 1407)
Elizabeth Lindsay (born 1407), married Robert Erskine, 1st Lord Erskine and had issue.

Earl David and Elizabeth Stewart are also assigned a number of children in error in many records, including
allegedly Marjorie Lindsay, assigned as the wife of Sir William Douglas of Lochleven. This is an error for Marjory Stewart who married firstly Sir Alexander Lindsay of Glenesk as his 2nd wife (and David's stepmother in fact), and secondly Sir Henry Douglas of Lochleven, by whom she was the mother of Sir William Douglas
allegedly Isabella Lindsay (born 1407), who married Sir John Maxwell. This was in fact the daughter of Sir James Lindsay of Crawford (uncle of Earl David) by his wife Egidia, or Giles, Stewart
Ingelram Lindsay, Bishop of Aberdeen (died 1458). Ingram Lindsay was dispensed on account of his having been illegitimate; he was acknowledged by Alexander Lindsay, 2nd Earl of Crawford as a kinsman and he may have been Earl David's son, but clearly not by Elizabeth Stewart.

Notes

Sources
Balfour Paul, Sir James-The Scots Peerage-IX Vols. Edinburgh 1904
Grant, Neil. Scottish Clans and Tartans.  New York, Octopus Publishing Group Limited: 2000.  
J. Ravilious, Dame Crystyane of Douglas and her ancestry, The Scottish Genealogist (Sept 2012), Vol. LIX, No. 3, pp. 129–138.

External links
Info on David Lindsay  from Clan Lindsay
House of Tartan page from Clan Lindsay
Various Lindsay marriages

1360 births
1407 deaths
David
1
Lord High Admirals of Scotland
David
14th-century Scottish military personnel
14th-century Scottish earls

Year of birth uncertain